Hip hop music can incorporate elements of classical music, either using live instruments or with recorded samples. Early examples of classical music instrumentation in hip hop date to the 1990s. In the 2000s,  artists such as Nas, Kendrick Lamar, The Black Violin, and DJ Premier began to prominently use classical music elements. Classical hip hop's biggest hit so far would be the 2009 Jay-Z and Alicia Keys duet Empire State of Mind, which has been described as an orchestral rap ballad. Post Malone would also flirt with the style as well on some of his songs.

Style

Typical classical music elements in hip hop include orchestral sounds, either sample-based or recorded live. In addition, some hip hop songs may feature orchestral elements by way of sampling progressive rock tracks, such as Kanye West sampling 21st Century Schizoid Man by King Crimson on his 2010 song Power.

History
An early example of classical music in hip hop is from the 1996 The Simpsons episode Homerpalooza. In the episode, rap group Cypress Hill steal the London Symphony Orchestra, which was intended for Peter Frampton. With the orchestra in tow, they perform their 1993 hit Insane in the Brain with orchestral backing. Warren G would embrace classical hip hop in a 1997 duet with Sissel on the track Prince Igor.

Starting in the 2000s, classical music in hip hop became moer prominent as Nas, Kendrick Lamar, Kanye West, and Jay-Z (with Alicia Keys on Empire State of Mind) exploring the genre. In addition to West's progressive rock sampling track Power, he also worked with progressive rock artist Manfred Mann on his 2014 album Lone Arranger.

In the late 2010s, Dallas based rapper Post Malone would break out, becoming a huge sensation with a versatile music style that stretches from rock to pop and to various forms of hip hop including classical hip hop.

References

Hip hop
Classical music